The 1981 Pacific Conference Games was the fourth edition of the international athletics competition between five Pacific coast nations: Australia, Canada, Japan, New Zealand and the United States. This was the first occasion that athletes from beyond the Pacific grouping were allowed to compete at the tournament. A total of 21 men's and 16 women's athletics events were contested. Combined track and field events were included for the first time, in the form of the men's decathlon and the women's pentathlon. The women's 3000 metres was also a new addition to the programme.

It was held at Queen Elizabeth II Park on 31 January and 1 February in Christchurch, New Zealand. The host stadium was built for and hosted 1974 British Commonwealth Games.

The competition had mandatory drug testing and two gold medallists were banned from the sport by the International Amateur Athletic Federation (IAAF) after anabolic steroids were detected in their urine. Ben Plucknett, an American who broke the men's discus world record twice that year, was stripped of his win in that event and later tried to sue the IAAF. Four-time Olympic champion Al Oerter stated that Plucknett had been made an example of due to his record breaking. Another American Olympian John Powell—who was consequently elevated to the Pacific Conference discus gold—criticised the fact that bans came top-down from the federation, rather than being seen before a judge or jury.

Australia's Gael Mulhall similarly had her shot put and discus titles removed for the same doping violation. Mulhall considered a legal appeal and team mate Bev Francis (who was promoted to the shot put gold) criticised the testing procedure, which had no team officials or doctors present. Ultimately Mulhall accepted a reduced 18-month ban, but did not publicly confirm whether she had taken steroids or not. Mulhall was criticised by Australian officials and members of the public as a drug cheat. She argued that testing was not of a reliable standard given the gravity of the sanctions and damage to her reputation, as well as saying that athletes needed more information on drugs and their effects.

Medal summary

Men

 Ben Plucknett of the United States was the original men's discus throw winner but his title was removed and his marks erased from the record due to his failing a doping test at the competition.

Women

 Australia's Gael Mulhall was the original women's shot put and discus throw winner but her titles were removed and her marks erased from the record due to her failing a doping test at the competition.

References

Medalists
Pacific Conference Games. GBR Athletics. Retrieved on 2015-01-14.

External links
Australian results in full 

Pacific Conference Games
Pacific Conference Games
International athletics competitions hosted by New Zealand
Pacific Conference Games
Sports competitions in Christchurch
January 1981 sports events in New Zealand
February 1981 sports events in New Zealand